Arriba is a Statutory Town located in Lincoln County, Colorado, United States. The town population was 202 at the 2020 United States census. Arriba is the Spanish word for "on high" or "above others."

Geography
Arriba is located at  (39.285589, -103.275624), along Interstate 70.

Demographics

As of the census of 2000, there were 244 people, 106 households, and 62 families residing in the town. The racial makeup of the town was 94.67% White, 0.82% Native American, 1.64% Asian, 2.05% from other races, and 0.82% from two or more races. Hispanic or Latino of any race were 5.74% of the population.

There were 106 households, out of which 26.4% had children under the age of 18 living with them, 48.1% were married couples living together, 6.6% had a female householder with no husband present, and 40.6% were non-families. 34.0% of all households were made up of individuals, and 17.9% had someone living alone who was 65 years of age or older.  The average household size was 2.30 and the average family size was 3.05.

In the town, the population was spread out, with 25.8% under the age of 18, 6.1% from 18 to 24, 26.2% from 25 to 44, 23.4% from 45 to 64, and 18.4% who were 65 years of age or older.  The median age was 41 years. For every 100 females, there were 96.8 males.  For every 100 females age 18 and over, there were 96.7 males.

The median income for a household in the town was $25,000, and the median income for a family was $27,500. Males had a median income of $27,188 versus $19,000 for females. The per capita income for the town was $13,370.  About 8.1% of families and 13.5% of the population were below the poverty line, including 3.0% of those under the age of eighteen and 19.6% of those 65 or over.

Attractions

The Arriba Town Museum is located in the Arriba Town Hall and contains memorabilia and historic artifacts on the history of the area. Grandpa Jerry's Clown Museum started in 1986 in Sterling and moved to Arriba in 2001. The museum claims to be the largest known collection of collectible clowns (baby rattles, cookie jars, cups, salt and pepper shakers, tea sets, vases, "piggy" banks, music boxes, frames, porcelain pieces, lamps, puppets, etc.). The collection comprises items from 28 states and 13 countries. The museum has since closed.

See also

 List of municipalities in Colorado

References

External links

 
 CDOT map of the Town of Arriba

Towns in Lincoln County, Colorado
Towns in Colorado